Jangy-Nookat is a town in Osh Region of Kyrgyzstan. It is part of the Nookat District. Its population (including the villages Döng-Kyshtak, Jandama, Katta-Tal, Künggöy-Khasana, Monchok-Döbö and Teskey) was 26,311 in 2021.

Population

References

Populated places in Osh Region